Agrotis cinerea, the light feathered rustic, is a moth of the family Noctuidae. The species was first described by Michael Denis and Ignaz Schiffermüller in 1775. It is found in southern and central Europe, northern Turkey, the Caucasus, western Turkmenia and Central Asia.

The wingspan is 33–40 mm. Forewing ashy grey, with darker irroration (sprinkling): claviform and orbicular stigmata obsolete: reniform a small dark lunule; a distinct diffuse dark median shade: hindwing whitish, in the female grey-tinged. — in the ab. alpigena Tur. the wings are paler and the markings indistinct, while in ab. livonica Teich they are very much darker. — ab. fusca Bsd., is larger than the typical form, and black brown; — subsp. tephrina Stgr. is smaller, with forewing narrower, and the markings much clearer; this form is confined to the south of England. Tutt, writing in 1892, Brit. Noct. 11, p. 76, evidently with only British specimens before him, did not notice that the British race was per se distinct from continental forms, so that the aberrations which he there put forward must be considered as applying solely to the British race: — these are ab. pallida Tutt, pale grey without median shade and all males; — ab. obscura Tutt nec Hbn. a unicolorous dull brown form generally (but not always) confined to females; and ab. virgata Tutt pale grey with a distinct reddish median shade, and all males.

Adults are on wing from May to June depending on the location and are active during both day and night and can be found near flowers, such as Berberis vulgaris

The yellowish-white egg has an indistinctly ribbed surface. Adult caterpillars are mostly earth-grey and thus well adapted to their surroundings. They have some indistinct, dark lines and stripes on the dorsum and sides. Black point warts stand out more intensely. The reddish-brown pupa is characterized by a comb-like cremaster with two short thorns.
The larvae feed on the roots and leaves of low-growing herbaceous plants and grasses, including Thymus praecox, Stellaria media, Medicago sativa, Rumex and Taraxacum.
.

Similar species
Agrotis simplonia
Euxoa birivia
Euxoa decora
Rhyacia helvetina
Epipsilia grisescens
Xestia ashworthii ssp. candelarum

References

Further reading
South R. (1907) The Moths of the British Isles, (First Series), Frederick Warne & Co. Ltd., London & NY: 359 pp. online Britain and Ireland

External links

Light Feathered Rustic at UKMoths

Lepiforum e.V.

Agrotis
Moths of Europe
Moths of Asia
Moths described in 1775